George Jack Henndry (1920-2011), was a male international table tennis player from the United States.

Table tennis career
He wod a bronze medal at the 1938 World Table Tennis Championships in the Swaythling Cup (men's team event) with Bernard Grimes, James McClure, Lou Pagliaro and Sol Schiff for the United States.

He won a first national junior championships in 1935. He reached an American national high ranking of 2 in the singles and 1 in the doubles. He later won 35 national seniors championships.

See also
 List of table tennis players
 List of World Table Tennis Championships medalists

References

American male table tennis players
1920 births
2011 deaths
World Table Tennis Championships medalists
20th-century American people